The Admirable was a First Rank three-decker ship of the line of the French Royal Navy. She was initially armed with 96 guns, comprising twenty-eight 36-pounder guns on the lower deck, thirty 18-pounder guns on the middle deck, and twenty-eight 8-pounder guns on the upper deck, with ten 6-pounder guns on the quarterdeck. In 1699 the 8-pounders on the upper deck were replaced by twenty-six 12-pounders, and two pairs of 6-pounders was removed from the quarterdeck, reducing the ship to 90 guns; one pair of 12-pounders was removed in 1704.

Designed and constructed by Laurent Coulomb, she was begun at Lorient Dockyard in July 1692 and launched on 23 December of the same year. She was a replacement for the previous ship of the same name, destroyed by an English fireship at Cherbourg in June 1692. She took part in the Battle of Lagos on 28 June 1693 and in the Battle of Vélez-Málaga on 13 August 1704. In July 1707 she was sunk in shallow water at Toulon to avoid the fire from bomb vessels, but was refloated in October. She was condemned at Toulon on 11 March 1713, and was broken up in June/August 1716.

References

Nomenclature des Vaisseaux du Roi-Soleil de 1661 a 1715. Alain Demerliac (Editions Omega, Nice – various dates).
The Sun King's Vessels (2015) - Jean-Claude Lemineur; English translation by François Fougerat. Editions ANCRE.  
Winfield, Rif and Roberts, Stephen (2017) French Warships in the Age of Sail 1626-1786: Design, Construction, Careers and Fates. Seaforth Publishing. . 

Ships of the line of the French Navy
1690s ships
Ships built in France